Quittance was a small galleon in the service of the English Navy Royal. She spent her early career in expeditions as far as Cadiz. She was later assigned to the Channel Guard during two more attempts by Philip II of Spain to invade England. she maintained this assignment until she went to Monson's squadron then back to the English Channel. She was condemned in 1618.

Quittance was the only named vessel in the English and Royal Navies.

Construction and specifications
She was built on the Thames possibly at Deptford under the guidance of Master Shipwright Mathew Baker. She was launched in 1590. Her tonnage was between 216 and 270 tons.

Her gun armament was in 1603 21 guns consisting of six demi-culverines, seven sakers, six minions and two falcons plus two fowlers. Her manning was around 100 officers and men in 1603.

Commissioned service
She was commissioned in 1590 under Captain Francis Burnell for service with Hawkyns and Frobisher's expedition. In 1594 Captain Henry Savile was her commander and assigned to Frobisher's squadron. In 1596 she was commanded by Captain Sir George Clifford for a voyage to Cadiz, Spain. Captain Humphrey Reynolds was her commander with Sir Richard Leveson's Channel Guard in 1599. She was with the Channel Guard until 1601. In 1602 she was assigned Captain Bryan Brown until September 1602 Then Captain Peter Beeston with Monson's squadron. In 1603 Captain Francis Howard was in command for service in the English Channel.

Disposition
Quittance was Condemned in 1618.

Notes

Citations

References
 British Warships in the Age of Sail (1603 – 1714), by Rif Winfield, published by Seaforth Publishing, England © Rif Winfield 2009, EPUB , Chapter 4, The Fourth Rates - 'Small Ships', Vessels in service or on order at 24 March 1603, Crane Group. Quittance
 Ships of the Royal Navy, by J.J. Colledge, revised and updated by Lt-Cdr Ben Warlow and Steve Bush, published by Seaforth Publishing, Barnsley, Great Britain, © the estate of J.J. Colledge, Ben Warlow and Steve Bush 2020, EPUB , Section Q (Quittance)
 The Arming and Fitting of English Ships of War 1600 - 1815, by Brian Lavery, published by US Naval Institute Press © Brian Lawery 1989, Part V Guns, Type of Guns

 

Ships of the Royal Navy
1600s ships